The Musée du Général Leclerc de Hauteclocque et de la Libération de Paris – Musée Jean Moulin was originally a museum located in the 15th arrondissement of Paris at 23, Allée de la 2e DB, Jardin Atlantique, Paris, France. It is open daily except Mondays;  admission is free of charge.

The museum opened in 1994 as Musée Jean Moulin to commemorate Jean Moulin, a major figure of the French Resistance, and the occupation of Paris during World War II. A prominent member of the French Resistance, Antoinette Sasse, bequeathed funds in her will to assist in the establishment of the museum. Its accompanying museum, the Musée du Général Leclerc de Hauteclocque et de la Libération de Paris, commemorates Maréchal Philippe Leclerc de Hauteclocque and the liberation of Paris.

The museum moved to the Ledoux Pavilion in the Place Denfert-Rochereau in the 14th arrondissement and was opened in October 2019, in time to mark the 75th anniversary of the liberation of Paris.

See also 
 List of museums in Paris

References

External links

 Musée du Général Leclerc de Hauteclocque et de la Libération de Paris – Musée Jean Moulin
 Paris.fr description
 ParisInfo description

Museums in Paris
World War II museums in France
Moulin
Buildings and structures in the 15th arrondissement of Paris
Museums established in 1994
1994 establishments in France